Viktor Drechsel (born 7 August 1960) is a retired Italian pole vaulter.

Biography
He won a bronze medal at the 1983 Mediterranean Games with the result 5.10 metres. He finished behind French Patrick Abada and Serge Leveur, but shared the bronze with countryfellow Mauro Barella.

His personal best jump was 5.52 metres, achieved in June 1985 in Formia., He has 11 caps in national team from 1981 to 1985.

See also
 Italian all-time lists - Pole vault

References

External links
Viktor Drechsel at All-athletics.com

1960 births
Living people
Sportspeople from Bolzano
Italian male pole vaulters
Mediterranean Games bronze medalists for Italy
Athletes (track and field) at the 1983 Mediterranean Games
Mediterranean Games medalists in athletics
20th-century Italian people
21st-century Italian people